A personal safety app or SOS app is a mobile application which can be used to aid personal safety. Such apps received increased prominence in the media after the 2012 Delhi gang rape case and consequent protests against "brutal rapes, molestation and mistreatment of women". Technology, including social and mobile tools, are playing an important role in improving overall personal safety, with technologies such as GPS, SMS, video, alerts, alarms, and more, allowing a user in distress to alert bystanders and close friends.

Features 
While most personal safety apps are offered as freeware, some are either distributed as a freemium app with paid features which can be unlocked through in-app purchases, supported through advertising, or marketed as paid applications. These include various features, including sending text messages, e-mails, IMs, or even Tweets to close friends (containing approximate location,) or emitting a loud intermittent "shrill whistle" in the manner of a rape alarm. Additional features include geofencing and preventive alerts. Some apps allow to customize the alert message sent and the ringtone that signals the reception of a new alert.

They normally include different triggering mechanisms to cope with different emergency situations. Common triggering mechanisms include pressing and holding the phone's switch button for a few seconds, shaking the phone vigorously, tapping on an alert button, and even loud screaming sound which the app can detect. When the alert signal is triggered, these apps automatically go to work, sending text messages and emails with exact location of the user to emergency contacts listed on the app.

In April 2016, the Indian government mandated that all cellphones sold in the country must contain a panic button function by 2017, activated through either a dedicated button or pressing the power key three times.

Popular Examples

Digital Chaperones 
Apps such as these allow people to keep an eye on one another and mimic chaperones in a way. This revolutionary kind of software application has the ability to empower individuals through their personal safety.

Reception 

Clinical research associate at BGS Global Hospital, Denet Pradeep, was of the opinion in early 2013 that such apps are ineffective without modification.

One Indian media professional noted the vague location information and the sometimes convoluted functionality, saying "You'd rather run away than [scroll to and] activate [the app]." She suggested that developers incorporate functionality which doesn't rely on the internet, because of the poor 3G connectivity in India in 2012.

References 

Alarms
Mobile software